Fotini is a feminine Greek given name and may refer to:

Fotini Markopoulou-Kalamara (born 1971), Greek theoretical physicist and academic
Fotini Pipili (born 1950), Greek journalist and politician
Fofi Gennimata (1964–2021), Greek politician
Fotini Vavatsi (born 1974), Greek archer

Greek feminine given names